Epicephala lativalvaris is a moth   of the family Gracillariidae. It is found in China (Hong Kong, Guangdong, Fujian and Hainan).

The larvae feed on Breynia fruticosa and Breynia rostrata.

References

Epicephala
Moths described in 2012